Lingbao may refer to:

 Lingbao School (灵宝派), branch of Taoism
 Lingbao City (灵宝市), county-level city of Sanmenxia, Henan, China
 Lingbao Gold (灵宝黄金), gold mining company headquartered in Lingbao City